Điện Biên Phủ ( is a city in the northwestern region of Vietnam. It is the capital of Điện Biên Province. The city is best known for the decisive Battle of Điện Biên Phủ, which occurred during the First Indochina War of independence against France. The region is a center of ethnic Thai culture. In prior history, the city was formerly called Muang Thaeng.

Until the creation of the province in 2004, Điện Biên Phủ was part of Lai Châu Province. The Vietnamese government elevated Điện Biên Phủ to town status in 1992, and to city status in 2003.

Demographics
Statistics on Điện Biên Phủ's population vary depending on definitions—figures are generally between 70,000 and 125,000. The city is growing quickly and was projected to have a population of 150,000 by 2020. 

According to statistics from the government, as of 2019, the city had a population of 80,366 people, covering an area of 308.18 km2.

Transport
National Route 12 connects Điện Biên to Lai Châu. Điện Biên Phủ Airport serves the city with air route to Hanoi.

History
The 8th century Thai locality of Muang Then is believed to have been centered here.

Nineteenth and early twentieth century 
 
Điện Biên Phủ was rather politically removed from central Vietnamese control until 1841. In this year, under the Nguyễn dynasty, Điện Biên Phủ was directly incorporated into the Vietnamese political system when they established the town as an administrative district. This was partly done for more direct control of the region and to stop bandits who were exploiting the opium trade.

In 1887, Điện Biên Phủ became a French protectorate. To ensure that the French would control the local opium trade, they appointed a sole administrator to supervise the trade and control the town. Other than a Hmong rebellion in 1918, the town was under French control until the Japanese occupied it during World War II. By early May 1945, the Japanese occupied Điện Biên Phủ and planned to convert it into a large military base. However, with an airstrip barely being enlarged, Chinese nationalist troops took the town in August of the same year. Subsequently, the nationalist forces then gave way to returning French troops.

Operation Castor (1953)

In the 1950s, the town was known for its famous opium traffic, generating 500,000,000 French francs annually. It was also an extensive source of rice for the Việt Minh.

The region was fortified in November 1953 by the French Union force in the biggest airborne operation of the 1946–1954 First Indochina War, Operation Castor, to block Việt Minh transport routes and to set the stage to draw out Việt Minh forces.

Siege of Điện Biên Phủ (1954)

The following year, the important Battle of Điện Biên Phủ was fought between the Việt Minh (led by General Võ Nguyên Giáp), and the French Union (led by General Henri Navarre, successor to General Raoul Salan). The siege of the French garrison lasted fifty-seven days, from 17:30, 13 March to 17:30, 7 May 1954. The southern outpost or fire base of "Camp Isabelle" did not follow the cease-fire order and fought until 01:00 the following day. The long-scheduled Geneva Meeting's Indochina conference involving the United States, the UK, the French Union and the USSR had already begun on 26 April 1954.

The battle was significant beyond the valleys of Điện Biên Phủ. Giáp's victory ended major French involvement in Indochina and led to the Geneva accords which partitioned Vietnam into North and South.

Climate

See also
 Battle of Điện Biên Phủ
 Operation Castor

Notes

External links

Điện Biên Phủ: History of the Battle
Erdal Can Alkoçlar

Media links
  The situation of Điện Biên Phủ, 50 years after the battle (French news, public channel France 2, 5 May 2004)Dinan Dinana inan

Populated places in Điện Biên province
Districts of Điện Biên province
Provincial capitals in Vietnam
Cities in Vietnam
 
Điện Biên province